Dharamtar port is on the right bank of the Amba river (i.e., Dharamtar creek) and is  from its mouth. Approximately  from Wadkhal village on NH-17. The port is also adjacent to Mumbai–Goa–Konkan railway line with an approved rail siding. It is a tri-modal port with rail (Dharamtar has an approved rail siding, the construction for which is under way).

Services
Some of the services it offers are container transportation by sea/road (rail proposed), bulk and break bulk cargo transport by sea/road, warehousing and distribution for all commodities, CFS facility, customs-notified warehousing (2,40,000 sq. ft of covered space), empty container management, container repairs and customs clearance.

Dharamtar Infrastructure Ltd., a joint venture company of United Shippers Ltd. and PNP Maritime Services Pvt. Ltd., which runs Dharamtar port have signed a cooperation agreement with The Indira Container Terminal Pvt. Ltd. for cargoes handled at ICT terminals.

Transport
Dharamtar port is a tri-modal port with focus on logistics engineering.
It handles container transportation as well as bulk and break bulk transportation by road, sea and rail (under development). Dharamtar port also carries out transshipment of containers. It is known for providing special scheduled barge services using the Inland water mode.

As far as the pier of this port the creek is at all times navigable. Steamers up to 200 tons can approach this port. Dharamtar upstream navigation is difficult.
Steamer services ply daily between Mumbai and Dharamtar.

Warehousing
The port has warehousing and distribution for all commodities.

Rail siding
Dharamtar port, with its ongoing rail siding development will soon be able to handle cargo across the regions. In future, a sizeable portion of Dharamtar's container transportation as well as bulk and break bulk transport will be carried by rail transport.

Notes
 A. Dharamtar Creek PNP Maritime Services Ltd. ( dharamatara khāḍī pī ēna pī mēriṭā'ima sav‍‌r'hisēsa kampanī) is main stock owner of Dharamtar port. As on 2009, the companies — Oxbow Coal of the U.S., Scorpio Group of Marshall Islands and Coeclerici Logistics of Italy — hold up to 10% stake each in United Shippers Ltd., which owns half of Dharamtar Port. PNP Maritime Services owns other half.

Dharamtar Creek
On the eastern side of the Mumbai harbour entrance lies the Dharamtar creek ( dharamatara khāḍī) of the river Amba, which is formed by confluence of Amba river, Karanja creek and Patalganga River on  the west coast of Maharashtra.

Dharamtar creek maintains rich zooplankton standing stock (av. 30.3 ml 100 m/3) with peak production during August–November. Zooplankton production rate for the entire system amounted to 10.32 mg C.100 m/3 d/1 with an annual turnover of 29 ton C.km/2.

References

External links
 Dharamtar Infrastructure Limited (official site)
 PNP Maritime Services Limited (official site)
 Maharashtra needs to develop minor ports-Source-The Hindu Business Line
 Ispat may fund port with sale of stake in firm-Source-Livemint.com

Geography of Maharashtra
Ports and harbours of Maharashtra
Raigad district